In the season 1978/79 Milan Associazione Calcio competed in Serie A, Coppa Italia and UEFA Cup.

Summary

The team fails to advance in Coppa Italia, Milan finishes in Group 4 in second place with 5 points with games won against Lecce and Foggia in the first rounds, after a shocking defeat with SPAL the team did not reach the victory against Catanzaro.

Although, Perugia were the first team during the round-robin era to go through the season undefeated, due to their number of drawn matches, they finished second in the league behind Milan.

Domestic league gave better results, with side stable at top in mid season. Retour half never saw Milan lose two consecutives games, for a trend that let him to recover points on Perugia. Following draws, in the final part of the season, insured Scudetto. It was the first domestic title since 1968, the tenth overall.

In a key strategic movement by manager Nils Liedholm, newly arrived Walter Novellino from Vicenza played as striker along with  Stefano Chiodi and Gianni Rivera.
In the final round of this campaign, the club captain Gianni Rivera retired after 19 seasons, he played 658 games scoring 164 goals letting the band to Albertino Bigon. Also, manager Nils Liedholm left the club after a contract dispute with the chairman.

Squad

(vice captain)

 (captain)

Transfers

Competitions

Serie A

League table

Result by round

Matches

Coppa Italia

First round 
Group 4

UEFA Cup

First round

Round of 32

Eightfinals

Statistics

Players statistics

References

External links
RSSSF – Italy 1978/79
 :it:Classifica calcio Serie A italiana 1979

A.C. Milan seasons
1979
Italian football clubs 1978–79 season